Atrauli  is a town and market center in Hariyon Municipality in Sarlahi District in the Janakpur Zone of south-eastern Nepal. The formerly village development committee was transformed into municipality merging the existing village development committees i.e. Atrouli, Sasapur, Dhaurkauli and Hariyon on May 18, 2014. At the time of the 1991 Nepal census it had a population of 4888 people living in 894 individual households.

Localities
 
 
Sakhuwani

References

External links
UN map of the municipalities of Sarlahi  District

Populated places in Sarlahi District